Canna discolor also known as Achira in Colombia is a species of the Canna genus, belonging to the family Cannaceae, found naturally in the range from South Mexico to Colombia, widely introduced elsewhere. It is a perennial growing to 3m. It is hardy to zone 10 and is frost tender. In the north latitudes it is in flower from August to October, and the seeds ripen in October. The flowers are hermaphrodite.

More than other Canna species, C. discolor is used extensively in agriculture in Asia. It grows high yields of very large rhizomes, sometimes the size of a man's arm, exceedingly rich in starch.

Synonyms
 C. achiras
 'Brick Canna'

Taxonomy
In the last three decades of the 20th century, Canna species have been categorised by two different taxonomists, Paulus Johannes Maria Maas from the Netherlands and Nobuyuki Tanaka from Japan. Inevitably, there are differences in their categorisations.

Maas considers Canna discolor to be a synonym of C. indica L., however, Tanaka's studies have revealed that C. indica can be clearly distinguished from other taxa, as a result he recognises several varieties:
Canna discolor var. discolor (Lindl.) Nb.Tanaka, 2001
A triploid, sterile both ways.

Canna discolor var. rubripunctata Nb.Tanaka, 2001
Green leaves with yellow flowers and many red spots. Seed parent sterile.

Canna discolor var. viridifolia Nb.Tanaka, 2001
No details available.

See also
 Canna
 List of Canna species
 List of Canna cultivars

References
 Cooke, Ian, 2001. The Gardener's Guide to Growing cannas, Timber Press. 
 Johnson's Gardeners Dictionary, 1856
 Tanaka, N. 2001. Taxonomic revision of the family Cannaceae in the New World and Asia. Makinoa ser. 2, 1:34–43.

External links
 Kew Gardens, Checklist of plant families
 TAXONOMIC STUDIES ON SOME EASTERN AND SOUTHEASTERN ASIATIC TAXA OF CANNA (CANNACEAE) Nobuyuki Tanaka, Hiroshi Uchiyama, Tetsuo Koyama and Jin Murata;

discolor